Sandhya is a 1969 Indian Malayalam film, directed by Dr. Vasan and produced by T. Komala. The film stars Sathyan, Padmini, Sharada, Jayabharathi and Adoor Bhasi in the lead roles. The film had musical score by M. S. Baburaj.

Cast
Sathyan
Padmini
Sharada
Jayabharathi
Adoor Bhasi
Muthukulam Raghavan Pillai
Bahadoor
K. P. Ummer
Khadeeja
Lakshmi

Soundtrack
The music was composed by M. S. Baburaj and the lyrics were written by Vayalar Ramavarma.

References

External links
 

1969 films
1960s Malayalam-language films